Surkhet Airport , also known as Birendranagar Airport is a domestic airport located in Birendranagar serving Surkhet District, a district in Karnali Province in Nepal. The Civil Aviation Authority of Nepal considers it an important hub for cargo transport into remote Western areas of Nepal, however this role is declining due to increasing road connectivity. Buddha Air has started daily flights to and from Kathmandu since 22 December, 2022 using its ATR-72 aircraft.

History
The airport was established in October 1966, however major connections to Kathmandu were only established with services from Buddha Air in 2018. Previously this airport was only used by Nepalese Army Air Service and local services.

Facilities
There are plans to extend the runway.

Airlines and destinations

Accidents and incidents
17 July 2002 - A Skyline Airways De Havilland Canada DHC-6 Twin Otter 300 (9N-AGF) left Jumla on a flight to Surkhet. Some 18 minutes after take-off and 10 km north of Surkhet, at an altitude of about 6500 feet, the aircraft crashed into trees on the Gargare Danda hill in bad weather. All two crew and two passengers were killed.
On 26 May 2010 a Tara Air DHC-6 Twin Otter had taken off from Surkhet Airport heading for Talcha Airport in Rara National Park, with 18 passengers and 3 crew on board.  At 10 am, the aircraft had to make an emergency landing at Surkhet after its cabin door suddenly opened five minutes after take-off. Tara Airlines officials said that the cabin attendant managed to lock the door immediately after it opened.

References

See also
List of airports in Nepal

Airports in Nepal
Buildings and structures in Surkhet District
1966 establishments in Nepal
Buildings and structures in Karnali Province